Kinleymore is a rural locality in the South Burnett Region, Queensland, Australia. In the  Kinleymore had a population of 93 people.

Geography 
The Proston railway line enters the locality from the east (Hivesville), passes through Kinleymore railway station in the centre of the locality, and then exits to the west (Proston). The line no longer operates and the station is abandoned.

History 
The locality was named after three of the original settlers in the area by combining parts of their surnames (Kinnear, Leys, Morey), and also used this as the railway station name from 2 March 1923. Previously the railway station was called Mobill (reported as a Waka language word meaning stony country).

Kinleymore Provisional School opened on 20 June 1913. On 1 February 1918 it became Kinleymore State School. It closed on 31 December 1969. The school was on the southern corner of Kinleymore School Road and Middle Road.

The section of  the Proston railway line that passes through the locality closed on 25 January 1993.

In the  Kinleymore had a population of 93 people.

References

Further reading 

 —includes the schools at Abbeywood, Brigooda, Hivesville, Kinleymore, Speedwell.

South Burnett Region
Localities in Queensland